Gilda Kirkpatrick (born 1973) is an Iranian-born New Zealand author, creative director and television personality. She starred as a main housewife on The Real Housewives of Auckland, which aired on Bravo. She was also the first contestant to be eliminated from Dancing With the Stars New Zealand in 2018.

She also wrote two educational series of sci-fi comic books called Astarons.

The Real Housewives of Auckland
In 2016, Kirkpatrick signed on for The Real Housewives of Auckland. One of her quotes, "Do you know what I've heard about you, not a f*****g thing", made her an internet meme. Kirkpatrick and fellow cast member Angela Stone occasionally had arguments throughout the series. Kirkpatrick also stated in an interview, "I also had a good conversation with Kylie Washington, the producer from Australia. She came to my house and I admired her as a woman. She explained that sometimes people aren’t happy with the programme – but if you be yourself then you’ll have no regrets. Plus she said that they wanted to hang onto us for a second series. So if you’re unhappy it’s no good for us".

As of 2019 there was no agreement for a second season of the show.

Astarons
Astarons is a series of educational books, written in the sci-fi comic genre, for kids aged seven and over. The books are about eight super heroes going on a journey through the solar system, exploring the galaxy and further galaxies to the edge of the universe.

Personal life 
Born in Iran, she moved to New Zealand and married James Kirkpatrick. Kirkpatrick has two children of her own. She is an anti-vaxxer.

References

Living people
Participants in New Zealand reality television series
Iranian emigrants to New Zealand
1973 births